Verdun is a commune in the Ariège department, southwestern France.

Geography
Verdun is located in the upper Ariège valley, in the Pyrénées.

Population
Inhabitants of Verdun are called Verdunois.

Sights
The village contains a Romanesque medieval church.

See also
Communes of the Ariège department

References

Communes of Ariège (department)
Ariège communes articles needing translation from French Wikipedia